Robert Harry Pickard (born September 3, 1952) is a former American football wide receiver who played in the National Football League for one season. He played college football at Xavier.

Professional career
Pickard signed with the Detroit Lions as an undrafted free agent following the 1974 NFL Draft. He played 14 games for the Lions in the 1974 season, catching eight passes for 88 yards and one touchdown.

Career statistics

References

External links
 Pro Football Archives bio

1952 births
Living people
American football wide receivers
Xavier Musketeers football players
Detroit Lions players
People from Canton, Ohio
Players of American football from Ohio